Maçka (the "club"; Laz: მაჩხა Maçxa) is a town and district of Trabzon Province in the Black Sea region of Turkey. The name derives from the medieval Greek Matzouka, which was one of the provinces of the Empire of Trebizond. In Ottoman times, the area formed the nahiye of Maçuka.

Gallery

See also
 Maçka (disambiguation)

References

External links

District governor's official website 
Matsouka (Maçka)

Populated places in Trabzon Province
Districts of Trabzon Province